The 1989 Bandy World Championship was the 16th Bandy World Championship and was contested between five men's bandy playing nations. The championship was played in the Soviet Union from 29 January-5 February 1989. This was the first ever indoor championships, held at the Olympic Stadium in Moscow, except for two matches in Krasnogorsk. The Soviet Union became the champion team.

Participants

Premier tour
 29 January
 Finland – Sweden 4–2
 Soviet Union – Norway 7–0
 30 January
 USA – Norway 1–7
 31 January
 Soviet Union – Sweden 2–3
 1 February
 Norway – Sweden 1–4
 Finland – USA 13–0
 2 February
 Norway – Finland 1–4
 Soviet Union – USA 14–1
 3 February
 Soviet Union – Finland 6–4
 USA – Sweden 0–19

Match for 3rd place
 5 February
 Sweden – Norway 6–0

Final
 5 February
 Soviet Union – Finland 12–2

References

International bandy competitions hosted by the Soviet Union
1989
1989 in bandy
1989 in Soviet sport
January 1989 sports events in Europe
February 1989 sports events in Europe